Nepenthes saranganiensis ("from Sarangani") is a tropical pitcher plant native to the Philippine island of Mindanao. It is noted for its extremely decurrent leaf attachment that extends a large distance down the stem, often continuing into the next internode.

Nepenthes saranganiensis belongs to the informal "N. alata group", which also includes N. alata, N. ceciliae, N. copelandii, N. extincta, N. graciliflora,  N. hamiguitanensis, N. kitanglad, N. kurata, N. leyte, N. mindanaoensis, N. negros, N. ramos, and N. ultra. These species are united by a number of morphological characters, including winged petioles, lids with basal ridges on the lower surface (often elaborated into appendages), and upper pitchers that are usually broadest near the base.

The species has no known natural hybrids. No forms or varieties have been described.

References

 Co, L. & W. Suarez 2012. Nepenthaceae. Co's Digital Flora of the Philippines.
  Kurata, S. 2003. Nepenthes saranganiensis Sh. Kurata の要約. Journal of Insectivorous Plant Society [July 2003] 54(3).
  Gronemeyer, T. & V. Heinrich 2008. Wiederentdeckung von Nepenthes surigaoensis am Naturstandort auf den Philippinen. Das Taublatt 60(1): 28–33.
 McPherson, S.R. & V.B. Amoroso 2011. Field Guide to the Pitcher Plants of the Philippines. Redfern Natural History Productions, Poole.
  McPherson, S. & T. Gronemeyer 2008. Die Nepenthesarten der Philippinen Eine Fotodokumentation. Das Taublatt 60(1): 34–78.

Carnivorous plants of Asia
Flora of Mindanao
saranganiensis
Plants described in 2003